= Golden Globe Award for Best Motion Picture =

The Golden Globe Awards are accolades bestowed by recognizing excellence in film, both American and international, and American television.

Golden Globe Award for Best Motion Picture may also refer to:

- Golden Globe Award for Best Motion Picture – Drama
- Golden Globe Award for Best Motion Picture – Musical or Comedy
